Fibuloides cyanopsis is a moth of the family Tortricidae. It is known from China (Guangdong, Guangxi, Guizhou), Japan, Vietnam, Indonesia and India.

References

Enarmoniini
Moths described in 1912